Rafik Bouchlaka is a Tunisian politician. He served as the minister of foreign affairs under Prime Minister Hamadi Jebali.

Education

Career
From 1987 to 1990, Bouchlaka was a member of the executive office of the Union Générale des Etudiants de Tunisie (UGET). In London, he founded the Maghreb Center for Research and Translation, and chaired the London Platform for Dialogue. He was also a visiting scholar at the Oxford Centre for Islamic Studies. He worked as senior researcher and head of the Research and Studies Office at the Al Jazeera Center for Studies. He is a member of the Centre Union Process. He has published two books and many articles in Asharq Al-Awsat.

He is a member of the Ennahda Movement, and the party leader Rached Ghannouchi's son-in-law. On 20 December 2011, after former President Zine El Abidine Ben Ali was deposed, he joined the Jebali Cabinet as minister of foreign affairs from 2011 to 2013 serving the first democratic government of Tunisia. Similar to Rached Ghannouchi, he was forced into exile during the Ben Ali regime where he became one of the leaders of the party's exiled bureau. Abdessalem was only able to return to his homeland after 21 years following the Tunisian revolution.

He is an Executive Bureau member of the Ennahdha Party, in charge of External Relations and a member of its Political Bureau, and has also been serving since 2007 in its Consultative Council, the higher decisional instance of the party.

He is the founder and Director of the Centre for Strategic and Diplomatic Studies (CSDS) established in 2014.

Bibliography
In Religion: Secularism and Democracy (Book not referred)
United States of America: Between Hard Power and Soft Power (Book not referred)

References

1968 births
Living people
Tunisian Muslims
Alumni of the University of Westminster
Mohammed V University alumni
Al Jazeera people
Government ministers of Tunisia
Ennahda politicians
Foreign ministers of Tunisia